Ochetellus sororis is a species of ant in the genus Ochetellus. Described by William M. Mann in 1921, the species is endemic to Fiji.

References

Dolichoderinae
Insects described in 1921
Insects of Fiji